Fred A. Risser (born May 5, 1927) is a retired American Democratic politician.  He holds the record as the longest-serving state legislator in American history, having served 58 years in the Wisconsin State Senate and six years in the Wisconsin State Assembly. Risser represented districts in central and western Madison, Wisconsin, including the campus of the University of Wisconsin–Madison. He was president of the Senate for 26 years and never lost an election. By 2019 Risser was the last World War II veteran serving as a state legislator in the United States.

Early life, education and career
Risser was born in Madison, Wisconsin on May 5, 1927 into a prolific Wisconsin political family. Risser's father (Fred E. Risser), grandfather (Ernest Warner), and great-grandfather (Clement Warner) served at various times as Wisconsin legislators representing part or all of Dane County, although none were Democrats.

Risser served in the United States Navy during World War II from 1945 to 1946. He was sworn into the Navy shortly before his high school graduation and Victory in Europe Day. He was a medic and served in Newport, Rhode Island and the Panama Canal Zone.

Risser used the G.I. Bill to attend college, attending the University of Wisconsin–Madison and Carleton College in Northfield, Minnesota before earning a Bachelor of Laws at the University of Oregon School of Law. He became a member of the State Bar of Wisconsin and the Oregon State Bar and practiced law in Wisconsin.

Wisconsin Legislature

Wisconsin Assembly
Risser was first elected to the Wisconsin State Assembly in 1956, succeeding fellow Democrat Ivan A. Nestingen (who had resigned in April of that year). He was elected to the state Senate in a 1962 special election triggered by the appointment of Horace W. Wilkie to the Wisconsin Supreme Court. He was succeeded in the Wisconsin Assembly by fellow Democrat Edward Nager.

Wisconsin Senate
Risser was elected to a full term in 1964 and was reelected every four years until his retirement. He rose through the ranks quickly, becoming the Minority Leader in 1967, which he credits to his intense study of parliamentary procedure.

In his 2004 electoral victory, he received more than 80% of the vote, facing opposition only from a Green Party candidate and no Republican opponent. In the 2007–08 session of the Wisconsin State Senate, Risser was elected as President of the Senate. He held this position on several prior occasions. He also has been President Pro Tempore, Minority Leader (1967–1973) and Assistant Minority Leader in the State Senate.

2011 Wisconsin protests

During the protests in Wisconsin, Risser, along with the 13 other Democratic State Senators, left the state to deny the State Senate a quorum on Governor Scott Walker's "Budget Repair" legislation.

Retirement 
On March 26, 2020, Risser announced that he would not run for re-election in November 2020.

Other political involvement
Risser was a delegate to both the 1960 Democratic National Convention and the 1964 Democratic National Convention. He served as the Chair of Wisconsin's Presidential electors during the 1964 presidential election.

Personal life
Risser's first wife, Betty, died after 21 years of marriage. Risser is married to Nancy Risser, a retired Spanish teacher. He has three children and several grandchildren.

References

External links
 
 
Fred Risser recalls his 1959 vote to give public employees in Wisconsin the right to join unions and bargain collectively, Wisconsin Eye, February 22, 2011, video interview

1927 births
United States Navy personnel of World War II
Carleton College alumni
Living people
Democratic Party members of the Wisconsin State Assembly
Oregon lawyers
2012 United States presidential electors
Politicians from Madison, Wisconsin
United States Navy sailors
University of Oregon alumni
University of Wisconsin–Madison alumni
Presidents of the Wisconsin Senate
Democratic Party Wisconsin state senators
2008 United States presidential electors
21st-century American politicians
Lawyers from Madison, Wisconsin
Military personnel from Madison, Wisconsin